Panagiotis Tsagalidis (born 5 March 2001) is a Greek professional footballer who plays as a left-back for Super League 2 club Panserraikos.

References

2001 births
Living people
Greek footballers
Greece youth international footballers
Super League Greece players
Aris Thessaloniki F.C. players
Panserraikos F.C. players
Association football defenders
Footballers from Ptolemaida